The statues of Madonna, Saint Dominic and Thomas Aquinas are outdoor sculptures by Matěj Václav Jäckel, installed on the north side of the Charles Bridge in Prague, Czech Republic. Later, these statues were moved to the Lapidarium of the National Museum of the Czech Republic.

References

External links
 

Books in art
Cultural depictions of Thomas Aquinas
Monuments and memorials in Prague
Sculptures of men in Prague
Sculptures of saints
Sculptures of women in Prague
Statues of the Madonna and Child
Statues on the Charles Bridge